The 1931 Tasmanian state election was held on 9 May 1931.

Retiring Members

No MHAs retired at this election.

House of Assembly
Sitting members are shown in bold text. Tickets that elected at least one MHA are highlighted in the relevant colour. Successful candidates are indicated by an asterisk (*).

Bass
Six seats were up for election. The Labor Party was defending three seats. The Nationalist Party was defending three seats.

Darwin
Six seats were up for election. The Labor Party was defending three seats, although Labor MHA Fergus Medwin was running as an independent. The Nationalist Party was defending three seats.

Denison
Six seats were up for election. The Labor Party was defending three seats. The Nationalist Party was defending three seats.

Franklin
Six seats were up for election. The Labor Party was defending two seats, although Labor MHA Benjamin Watkins was running as an independent. The Nationalist Party was defending three seats. Independent MHA Benjamin Pearsall was defending one seat.

Wilmot
Six seats were up for election. The Labor Party was defending three seats. The Nationalist Party was defending three seats.

See also
 Members of the Tasmanian House of Assembly, 1928–1931
 Members of the Tasmanian House of Assembly, 1931–1934

References
Tasmanian Parliamentary Library

Candidates for Tasmanian state elections